The 1997 Chittagong earthquake (also known as the Bandarban earthquake) occurred on 21 November at 11:23 UTC in the Bangladesh-India-Myanmar border region. It had a magnitude of  6.1. The epicenter was located in southern Mizoram, India. No fatalities were reported there, but 23 people were killed in Chittagong when a five-story building collapsed in Bangladesh. The shaking could also be felt in Dhaka.

See also 
List of earthquakes in 1997
List of earthquakes in Bangladesh
List of earthquakes in India

References

External links 

1997 earthquakes
Earthquakes in Bangladesh
1997 Chittagong earthquake
Earthquakes in India
History of Chittagong Division
Earthquake
1997 in Bangladesh
History of Mizoram
Earthquake
November 1997 events in Asia
1997 disasters in Asia 
1997 disasters in Bangladesh 
1997 disasters in India 
1997 disasters in Myanmar